Acartauchenius leprieuri is a species of sheet weaver found in Algeria. It was described by O.P.-Cambridge in 1875.

References

Linyphiidae
Spiders of North Africa
Spiders described in 1875